Open Water is the fourth regular studio album by German pop singer Sasha, released by Warner Music on 3 March 2006 in German-speaking Europe.

Although the album charted significantly higher than its predecessor Surfin' on a Backbeat (2001) throughout Europe, reaching number seven on the German Albums Chart and the top forty in Austria and Switzerland, it failed to match its sales, eventually becoming Sasha's lowest-selling album, to date. Open Water produced two singles only, including "Slowly" and "Goodbye."

Track listing
 "I'm Alive" — 3:51 
 "Automatic" — 3:40 
 "Slowly" — 4:17 
 "Different Me" — 3:57 
 "Open Water" — 3:33 
 "Breathe" — 4:31 
 "Paralyzed" — 4:08 
 "Miracle Mile" — 2:58 
 "Good Things" — 3:36 
 "How Do You Know" — 4:20 
 "Wake the Sun" — 5:23 
 "Goodbye" — 3:33

Chartss

Weekly charts

References

External links 
 Sasha.de — official website

2006 albums
Sasha (German singer) albums